was a town located in Uma District, Ehime Prefecture, Shikoku, Japan.  

As of 2003, the town had an estimated population of 17,387 and a density of 200.59 persons per km². Its total area was 86.68 km².

On April 1, 2004, Doi along with the village of Shingū (also from Uma District), and the old cities of Iyomishima and Kawanoe, was merged to create the city of Shikokuchūō.

See also
Doi, Ehime (village) - a predecessor of the town
Doi taikomatsuri - a festival in Doi

Dissolved municipalities of Ehime Prefecture
Shikokuchūō